Seamus Blake (born December 8, 1970) is a British-born Canadian tenor saxophonist.

Early life and education
Blake was born in London, England and raised in Vancouver, British Columbia, Canada. His mother introduced him to jazz when he was a child and he later attended the Berklee College of Music in Boston.

Career 
Upon graduation, he moved to New York City. In February 2002, he won the Thelonious Monk International Saxophone Competition. He currently plays with his own quintet (featuring David Kikoski, Lage Lund, Bill Stewart, and Matt Clohesy) and has been a regular with the Mingus Big Band as well as many other New York musicians.

In 2022 Seamus became a member of Roger Waters touring band for the This Is Not a Drill tour.  Seamus is playing sax on Pink Floyd classic songs as well as Waters solo material.

Discography

As leader
 The Call (Criss Cross, 1994)
 The Bloomdaddies (Criss Cross, 1996)
 Four Track Mind (Criss Cross, 1997)
 Stranger Things Have Happened (Fresh Sound, 1999)
 Sun Sol (Fresh Sound, 2000)
 Echonomics (Criss Cross, 2001)
 Live Au Cabaret (Effendi, 2001)
 Way Out Willy (Criss Cross, 2007)
 Live in Italy (Jazz Eyes 2008)
 Bellwether (Criss Cross, 2009)
 Live at Smalls (SmallsLIVE, 2010)
 As You Like with BANN (Jazz Eyes 2010)
 Superconductor (5Passion 2015)
 Reeds Ramble with Chris Cheek (Criss Cross, 2014)
 Let's Call the Whole Thing Off with Chris Cheek (Criss Cross, 2016)
 Guardians of the Heart Machine (Whirlwind, 2019)

With Opus 5
 Introducing Opus 5 (Criss Cross, 2011)
 Pentasonic (Criss Cross, 2012)
 Progression (Criss Cross, 2014)
 Tickle (Criss Cross, 2015)

As sideman
With Lea DeLaria
 Play It Cool (Warner Bros., 2001)
 Double Standards (Telarc, 2003)
 House of David (Ghostlight, 2015)
 The Live (Smoke Sessions, 2008)

With David Kikoski
 The Maze (Criss Cross, 1999)
 Combinations (Criss Cross, 2001)
 The Five (DIW, 2002)
 Limits (Criss Cross, 2006)

With Victor Lewis
 Eeeyyess! (Enja, 1997)
 Know It Today, Know It Tomorrow (Red Record, 1993)
 Three Way Conversations (Red Record, 1997)

With Monday Michiru
 Episodes in Color (SAR, 2002)
 Don't Disturb This Groove (Grand Gallery, 2011)
 Brasilified (Billboard, 2013)

With Mingus Big Band
 Blues & Politics (Dreyfus, 1999)
 I Am Three (Sunnyside/Sue Mingus, 2005)
 Live in Time (Dreyfus, 1996)
 Live in Tokyo (Sunnyside/Sue Mingus, 2006)
 Que Viva Mingus! (Dreyfus, 1997)
 Tonight at Noon... Three or Four Shades of Love (Dreyfus, 2002)

With Eric Reed
 The Baddest Monk (Savant, 2012)
 Groovewise (Smoke Sessions, 2014)
 The Adventurous Monk (Savant, 2014)

With Alex Sipiagin
 Mirrors (Criss Cross, 2003)
 Returning (Criss Cross, 2005)
 Mirages (Criss Cross, 2009)
 Live at Smalls (SmallsLIVE, 2013)
 From Reality and Back (5Passion 2013)

With others
 Franco Ambrosetti, Live at the Blue Note (Enja, 1993)
 Diego Barber, 411 (Origin, 2013)
 Ronnie Blake, Assimilation (Hi Speed Horns, 2017)
 Erin Bode, Over and Over (Maxjazz, 2006)
 Monika Borzym, Girl Talk (Sony, 2011)
 Robi Botos, Movin' Forward (A440, 2015)
 Brazilian Girls, Brazilian Girls (Verve Forecast, 2005)
 Brazilian Girls, Lazy Lover (Verve Forecast, 2004)
 Dave Douglas, Freak In (Bluebird, 2002)
 Billy Drummond, The Gift (Criss Cross, 1994)
 Fleurine, Fire (Coast to Coast 2002)
 Sara Gazarek, Return to You (Native Language, 2007)
 Wycliffe Gordon, Dig This! (Criss Cross, 2002)
 Wycliffe Gordon, United Soul Experience (Criss Cross, 2002)
 Danny Grissett, Form (Criss Cross, 2009)
 George Gruntz, Sins'n Wins'n Funs' Left-cores and Hard-core En-cores (TCB, 1996)
 Kevin Hays, Go Round (Blue Note, 1995)
 David Hazeltine, For All We Know (Smoke Sessions, 2014)
 Conrad Herwig, Unseen Universe (Criss Cross, 2000)
 Conrad Herwig, Obligation (Criss Cross, 2005)
 Scott Kinsey, No Sleep (Kinesthetic Music, 2017)
 Jane Monheit, The Lovers, the Dreamers and Me (Concord, 2008)
 Josh Nelson, Let It Go (Omagatoki, 2007)
 Robert Sadin, Art of Love: Music of Machaut (Deutsche Grammophon, 2009)
 Antonio Sanchez, The Meridian Suite (CAM Jazz, 2015)
 Ken Schaphorst, Purple (Naxos, 1998)
 John Stetch, Carpatian Blues (Terra Nova, 1996)
 Bill Stewart, Telepathy (Blue Note, 1997)
 Bill Stewart, Space Squid (Pirouet, 2015)
 Helen Sung, Going Express (Sunnyside, 2011)
 Mark Turner, Yam Yam (Criss Cross, 1995)
 Manuel Valera, Forma Nueva (Mavo, 2004)
 Jesse van Ruller, Circles (Criss Cross, 2003)
 Jesse van Ruller, Views (Criss Cross, 2006)
 Sam Yahel, Jazz Side of the Moon (Chesky, 2008)
 Peter Zak, One Mind (Fresh Sound, 2018)
 Mark Zubek, Twentytwodollarfishlunch (Fresh Sound, 2009)
 Dan Costa (Composer), Skyness (Independent, 2020)

References

1970 births
Living people
Musicians from London
Canadian jazz saxophonists
Male saxophonists
Musicians from Vancouver
Chesky Records artists
21st-century saxophonists
21st-century Canadian male musicians
Canadian male jazz musicians
Mingus Big Band members
Basho Records artists
Criss Cross Jazz artists
Fresh Sounds Records artists
Whirlwind Recordings artists